The eleventh series of the British television drama series Waterloo Road began airing on 3 January 2023 on BBC One and was released as a boxset on BBC iPlayer on the same day. The series follows the lives of staff and pupils of the eponymous school in Greater Manchester. It was the first series aired for eight years. The series contains seven episodes.

A twelfth series is expected later in 2023.

Plot 
The show follows the lives of the teachers and the pupils at the eponymous school of Waterloo Road, a failing Greater Manchester secondary school, tackling a wide range of social issues. The series deals with issues including child abandonment, homelessness, knife crime, bereavement, eviction, eating disorders, marital breakdown, refugee children, and the sexual objectification of girls.

The series begins on the first day of the new academic term at William Beswick High School, which is beleaguered with student protests against the commemoration of the school's fictional namesake, who was a slave trader. A student riot leads to parent Chlo Charles (Katie Griffiths) being hit by a car; she collapses later that evening and is pronounced dead.

Development

Recommissioning 
The original show ran for ten series from 2006 to 2015. On 2 April 2014, the BBC announced that series 10 would be the show's last. The final episode was the show's 200th and aired on 9 March 2015, exactly nine years after the first episode.

After a seven-year hiatus, on 23 September 2021, the BBC announced that Waterloo Road would return with a new series on BBC One. The recommission was part of the BBC's Across the UK initiative to reflect audiences outside London, and selected after the old show attracted significant repeats on iPlayer among younger age groups, after the entire series was made available on the platform in September 2019.

Production 
The series' production returned to Greater Manchester, with the school set at the former St Ambrose Barlow Roman Catholic High School in Swinton. Filming commenced in February 2022, with production by Wall to Wall Media and Rope Ladder Fiction, a new company founded by Cameron Roach, who was executive producer for series 7 and 8.

On 15 October 2022, the BBC revealed a new title card and revamped version of the theme tune on their social media channels.

Casting 
On 24 January 2022, the BBC revealed that former cast members Adam Thomas, Katie Griffiths and Angela Griffin would reprise their roles as Donte Charles, Chlo Charles and Kim Campbell respectively, with Campbell now as Waterloo Road's headteacher. On 21 February 2022, the actors selected to play the pupils were revealed. Notably, Scarlett Thomas, daughter of former Waterloo Road actor Tina O’Brien and niece of Adam Thomas, was cast as his on-screen daughter Izzie Charles.

Transmission 
On 25 November 2022, the BBC confirmed that Waterloo Road would return in January 2023 and would contain seven episodes.

On 6 December 2022, the BBC confirmed that Waterloo Road would premiere on 3 January 2023, replacing Holby City in the Tuesday 8PM slot, after the show's cancellation in June 2021. The BBC confirmed that all episodes from the series would be released on BBC iPlayer as a boxset on the same day.

Podcast 
To coincide with the series, BBC Sounds launched 'Waterloo Road — The Official Podcast', consisting of 7x10 minute episodes. These were hosted by cast members Adam Thomas (Donte Charles) and Priyasasha Kumari (Samia Choudhry). Two longer 20 minute episodes were also released as bookends to the series.

Cast and characters

Staff 

 Angela Griffin as Kim Campbell; Headteacher
 Adam Thomas as Donte Charles; School caretaker
 Kym Marsh as Nicky Walters; School canteen worker
 Jo Coffey as Wendy Whitwell; PA to Headteacher Kim Campbell
 Vincent Jerome as Lindon King; Deputy Head
 James Baxter as Joe Casey; Deputy Head
 Sonia Ibrahim as Jamilah Omar; School social worker
 Shauna Shim as Valerie Chambers; Music teacher
 Neil Fitzmaurice as Neil Guthrie; History teacher
 Rachel Leskovac as Coral Walker; Head of English
 Katherine Pearce as Amy Spratt; Early career teacher

Pupils 
 Adam Abbou as Danny Lewis
 Noah Valentine as Preston Walters
 Alicia Forde as Kelly-Jo Rafferty
 Adam Ali as Kai Sharif
 Priyasasha Kumari as Samia Choudhry
 Francesco Piacentini-Smith as Dean Weever
 Liam Scholes as Noel McManus 
 Lucy Eleanor Begg as Caz Williams
 Summer Violet Bird as Tonya Walters
 Scarlett Thomas as Izzie Charles
 Ava Flannery as Verity King
 Thapelo Ray as Dwayne Jackson
 Inathi Rozani as Zayne Jackson
 Chiamaka (ChiChi) Ulebor as Shola Aku
 Sahil Ismailkhil as Norullah Sayid
 Randi Agyare as Millie Adebayo 
 Elliott Longworth as Jake West

Others

Recurring 
 Lisa Faulkner as Hannah King
 Sue Vincent as Erica Thorn
 Teddy Thomas as Tommy Charles
 Hollie-Jay Bowes as Debs Rafferty

Guest 
 Katie Griffiths as Chlo Charles (Episode 1)
Ryan Clayton as Sergeant Mike Rutherford (Episode 1)
 Chelsee Healey as Janeece Bryant (Episode 2)
 Marie Critchley as Barbara Rafferty (Episode 3)
 Lee Lomas as Mac (Episode 3)
 William Thompson as Pete (Episode 5)
 Jonathan Ojinnaka as Jamie Bedford (Episode 6)
 Alicya Eyo as Marie Lewis (Episode 6)

Episodes

Reception 
Writing in The Telegraph, Poppie Platt rated the series three stars out of five. Platt said that the series featured "just too many characters" with themes that "aren't fully developed", and was "held back by woke dialogue" using too many "cloying buzzwords". In a two-star review for The Guardian, Jack Seale wrote that the series' "attempts to crowbar heavy social issues into a soapy setting are jarring" and the soap opera-esque storylines, like that of Donte and Chlo Charles, felt more natural. However, he noted that this was not an issue for the revival in particular, stating that Waterloo Road was "always a show that felt more important for the boxes it ticked and the services it provided than for the quality of its drama". In The Times, James Jackson gave the series three stars, calling it "an old-school revival that could do better."

References

2023 British television seasons
Waterloo Road (TV series)